Cerro de la Cruz del Marqués is a peak of the Ajusco Mountain Range, and their highest point.

The mountain is located in Cumbres del Ajusco National Park, at the outskirts of Mexico City.

Landforms of Mexico City
Mountains of Mexico